is a collaborative studio album by Japanese jazz trumpeter Toshinori Kondo and Japanese hip hop producer DJ Krush. It was released on August 8, 1996 in Japan by Sony Music Entertainment. The album was issued in Europe by the R&S Records imprint Apollo on January 26, 1998, and in the United States by Instinct Records on March 23, 1999.

Composition
Ki-Oku consists of 10 proper tracks and three short interludes. It features a cover of "Sun Is Shining", which was originally written and performed by Bob Marley.

Critical reception

Rick Anderson of AllMusic said that Ki-Oku is primarily an album of "smooth-groove jazz" music, but "reveals more with repeated listens; if it sounds too easy at first, listen again – there's lots of interesting stuff going on beneath what sometimes sounds like a merely pleasant surface." In 2015, Fact placed Ki-Oku at number 25 on its list of the best trip hop albums of all time.

Track listing

Personnel
Credits are adapted from the album's liner notes.

Musicians
 Toshinori Kondo – acoustic trumpet, electric trumpet, arrangement
 DJ Krush – beats, programming, scratching, arrangement

Production

 Toshinori Kondo – production
 DJ Krush – production
 Noriko Asano – executive production
 Shuichi Ikebuchi – mixing, recording
 Masahito Kitayama – executive production
 Koichi "Oppenheimer" Matsuki – mixing on "Sun Is Shining"
 Yuki Noda – executive production
 Masayo Takise – mastering
 Naohiko Yamada – associate production

Design

 Mikio Hasui – photography
 Miki Terada – art direction, design
 Masakazu Yamamoto – art direction, design
 Shigeru Yamaoka – art direction, design

Charts

References

External links
 

1996 albums
Collaborative albums
Toshinori Kondo albums
DJ Krush albums
Sony Music Entertainment Japan albums
Instinct Records albums
R&S Records albums